Sproson is an English surname. Notable people with the surname include:

 Archie Sproson (1890–1980), English footballer
 Emma Sproson, English suffragette
 Phil Sproson (born 1959), English footballer
 Roy Sproson, English footballer
 Thomas Sproson, English footballer

English-language surnames